Kamori also known as the Gulabi, is a popular goat breed found in India and in the Sindh province of Pakistan. They have a distinctive body structure with long ears and neck and a large body, and a distinctive color. The purebred Kamori goat is dark brown with small coffee-colored or dark patches over its entire body.  Pure Kamoris are rare and expensive. Kamoris have been crossed with Patairee goats, another breed found in Sindh; hybrids have the Kamori's body structure, but are less expensive. Additionally, genetic analysis confirmed that the appearance of the Kamori and Pateri (also known as Patairee) goat species are very similar in that both species have long ears and brown coats, although Pateri (Patairee) goat species sometimes appear to have brown front quarters and white hindquarters. 

The Kamori breed is chiefly found in the districts of Dadu, Larkana, and Nawabshah. It is primarily used for the production of milk.

References

Goat breeds
Dairy goat breeds
Goat breeds originating in Pakistan